Gli sbronzi di Rialto (The drunks of Rialto) is an album by Catarrhal Noise.

The title is a pun with I Bronzi di Riace ("Riace bronzes"), Gli Sbronzi di Riace ("The drunks of Riace", another Italian band), and the Rialto Bridge (since Catarrhal Noise home town, Noale, is in the Venice's province).

The songs El toro and A grilliata were later re-recorded in the album Turboamerica.

Track listing
"Good Morning"
"Bar Grezzume"
"Se sulu baby"
"Più ci penso"
"A grilliata"
"Bidè lè cul"
"Puma Blues"
"Allora ragazzi"
"Positivo"
"Gli sbronzi di Rialto"
"El toro"
"I'm Sbrodeghezzo"
"Venexia"
"Fach de Brisioela"
"Gasso"
"Bruto"
"Marengo Bros."
"It's Rock'n'Roll"

1999 albums
Catarrhal Noise albums